Karita Tykkä (born Karita Tuomola; 22 September 1976) is a Finnish television host, actress and model. She won the Miss Finland beauty pageant in 1997 and the Miss Baltic Sea pageant in 1998. In 2001, she made her debut as an actress in the comedy film Ponterosa.

Tykkä married sports supplement entrepreneur Petri Tykkä on 9 August 2008 in Helsinki and they have one son (b. 2010). Prior to this, she was engaged to television host Joonas Hytönen.

References

External links 

1976 births
Finnish female models
Living people
Miss Finland winners
Miss Universe 1997 contestants
People from Kuopio